Luciano Borzone (1590 – 12 July 1645) was an Italian painter of a late-Mannerist and early-Baroque styles active mainly in his natal city of Genoa.

Biography
After an apprenticeship with Filippo Bertolotto, his uncle, the Duke Alberigo of Massa Lunigiana patronized his work as a pupil of Cesare Corte. He was a prominent portrait painter. In Genoa, he painted the Presentation in the Temple for the church of San Domenico, and the Baptism of Christ for the church of Santo Spirito. Supposedly died from a fall from scaffolding while painting a picture of a Nativity for ceiling of the Nunziata del Vastato. His three sons, Giovanni Battista and Carlo (both who died of the plague in 1657), and Maria Francesco (1625–1679) were also painters. Additional disciples were Giovanni Battista Mainero, Giovanni Battista Monti, Gioacchino Assereto, and Silvestro Chiesa.

He etched some plates from his own compositions: Portrait of Giustiniani; St. Peter delivered from Prison; Prometheus devoured by the Vulture; Children playing; and a set of devout subjects.  Maria Francesco, the third son, excelled in painting landscapes and sea-pieces in the style of Lorrain and Pouissin, and came to be employed at the court of Louis XIV. He was born in 1625, and died in 1679.

References

Camillo Manzitti, "Riscoperta di Luciano Borzone'', in "Commentari", n. 3, Luglio-Settembre 1969.
Camillo Manzitti, "Influenze caravaggesche a Genova e nuovi ritrovamenti su Luciano Borzone", in "Paragone", n. 259, Settembre 1971.

1590 births
1645 deaths
Painters from Genoa
17th-century Italian painters
Italian male painters
Italian Baroque painters